Augustula braueri is a species of air-breathing land snail, terrestrial pulmonate gastropod mollusk in the family Streptaxidae.

Augustula braueri is the only species within the genus Augustula.

Distribution 
Augustula braueri is endemic to the Seychelles.

References

Streptaxidae